The Last Encore Tour is a concert tour by American recording artist, The Judds. The tour is the duo's first tour in 10 years, the last being the "Power to Change Tour" in 2000. The duo states this is the final farewell tour for the group. The tour began November 2010 and ended in December. In 2011, the duo announced a second United States leg for the summer of 2011. The tour predominately visited the United States.

The duo stated that the purpose for the tour was to reconnect with their fans. The tour's title was suggested by fans on Wynonna's website, as the duo had to come up with a name. Naomi Judd remarked "[I] was going to suggest 'The Cougar Tour'." They were joined on tour by the Palmetto State Quartet.

Background
In 2009, the duo performed together for the first time in nine years the 2009 CMA Music Festival at LP Field. The performance spaced media outlets within the country music scene to hint to a reunion of the duo to be as early as 2010. During the summer of 2009, the duo made rare concert appearances together, including a stop at the Mohegan Sun Arena in Uncasville, Connecticut. The duo also opened a museum in Franklin, Tennessee, to commemorate their 25 years in country music. In the course of an interview for Billboard, Wynonna Judd stated the duo was open to perform on tour and recording new music in 2010. She continued, "It's 2010. It's been 25 years. It's take your mother to work year. It just feels like it's the right time". Judd wanted to bring her mother, Naomi Judd along for her annual "Classic Christmas Tour", however Naomi declined.

The tour was officially announced in February 2010. The duo would later headline the 2010 CMA Music Festival. At the press conference following the event, the duo remark the audience response for their 2009 show encouraged them to go on this trek one final time. Naomi stated her woman's intuition have her the courage to get back on stage and concert promoters assured her there was a demand for the tour. Also, the duo announced their first reality television series entitled The Judds, to air on OWN: Oprah Winfrey Network. The show will follow the duo's tour, while showing their mother-daughter relationship in both a public and private scope. To promote the tour, the duo appeared on Larry King Live, The Early Show, The Oprah Winfrey Show, Weekend Edition and Crook & Chase, while gracing the covers of Country Weekly and People: Country Special.

To introduce the tour, the duo stated: "[Wynonna] This tour gives me a chance to enjoy where Mom and I are in our relationship. I look forward to celebrating our personal and professional journey…together. [Naomi] There is nothing like music and laughter to connect people. How I've missed that encounter with the very ones who've allowed us that awesome privilege! I'm counting the days till I can be back on my bus, visiting their towns."

Setlist

Additional notes
During the concert at the 1stBank Center in Broomfield, Colorado; The Judds were joined onstage by the Bristol Elementary School Choir (from Colorado Springs) to perform "Love Can Build a Bridge"
"Ave Maria" was often performed in lieu of "Silent Night".

Tour dates

Festivals and other miscellaneous performances
This performance was a benefit concert for "Toys for Tots"
This performance was a part of the "Florida Strawberry Festival"
This performance is a part of "Ravinia Festival"
This performance is a part of "Pepsi Outdoor Summer Concerts"
This performance is a part of the "Big Valley Jamboree"
This performance is a part of the "Oregon State Fair"
These performances are a part of "Norsk Høstfest"

Box office score data

Critical reception
Overall, the tour received praise from both music critics and its spectators. Jon Bream (Star Tribune) notes despite Wynonna's vocal problems, the duo were still able to pull off a fantastic show at the sold out Mystic Showroom. He elaborates, "As Wynonna handed lead vocal chores to her backup singers, it seemed appropriate—for more reasons than one—that the Judds ended their Last Encore show with Silent Night". Gary Budzak (The Columbus Dispatch) called the evening a success for the Columbus audience. He states, "On more than 30 songs that spanned a quarter-century, The Judds have proved they still had the wherewithal to charm the crowd, whether it was Wynonna hugging a 4-year-old girl on stage; or Naomi kissing her husband, bass singer Larry Strickland, on a cover of Don't Be Cruel".

The praise continued with Kevin C. Johnson (St. Louis Post-Dispatch). The concert at the Family Arena served as a fitting finale for the duo. He explains, "This is The Last Encore tour, positioned as the final go-round for country music's most successful mother-daughter duo, which doesn't bode well for future Juddheads. Then again, we've already learned final doesn't always mean the end when it comes to the Judds, so time will tell". At the EnergySolutions Arena, Tom Wharton (The Salt Lake Tribune) says that the Judds were "going out in styles". He further comments, "The pair utilized a video screen behind them for retrospective moments, showing family photos and highlights from their career, as well as two big screens on either side of the stage that allowed an appreciative crowd of about 5,000 a chance to enjoy closeup views of the performers".

At the ARCO Arena, Carla Meyer (The Sacramento Bee) notes The Judds provided an intimate show, reminding the audience of the "good ol' days" She continues, "But the familiarity goes beyond song. Naomi, 64, and Wynonna, 46, long ago charmed and confided their ways into fans' hearts by publicly discussing their health woes, tricky family dynamics and Wynonna's weight battles and bad luck with men. Whether through their many appearances on "Oprah" or osmosis, you feel like you know them".

References

2010 concert tours
2011 concert tours
The Judds concert tours
Farewell concert tours
The Judds